Jayan Jayawardene (born 24 December 1983) is a Sri Lankan cricketer. He made his first-class debut for Chilaw Marians Cricket Club in the 2006–07 Premier Trophy on 8 December 2006.

See also
 List of Chilaw Marians Cricket Club players

References

External links
 

1983 births
Living people
Sri Lankan cricketers
Chilaw Marians Cricket Club cricketers
Place of birth missing (living people)